"Shut Down" is a song written by Brian Wilson and Roger Christian for the American rock band the Beach Boys. The primary melody is a twelve-bar blues. On March 4, 1963, it was released as the B-side of the single "Surfin' U.S.A.", three weeks ahead of the album of the same name on which both tracks appeared. Capitol Records released it again later that year on the album Little Deuce Coupe. The single peaked at number 23 in the US on the Billboard Hot 100 chart (number seven on the United Press International chart published in newspapers), and number 34 in the UK.

History
The song details a drag race between a Super-Stock 413 cu. in.-powered 1962 Dodge Dart and a fuel-injected 1963 Chevrolet Corvette Sting Ray and is derived from a longer poem by Christian. The song is sung from the perspective of the driver of the Sting Ray who brags that he will "shut down" the 413. (In hot rod racing slang, to "shut down" someone means to beat that person in a race.) While the implication is that the Sting Ray will win the race, the song ends before the end of the race with the 413 still in the lead, with the Sting Ray closing the gap. Although the race is often interpreted as having an inconclusive outcome, the lyrics in the outro refrain do state, "Shut it off, shut it off/Buddy now I shut you down", clearly indicating that the narrator, in his Corvette Sting Ray, has in fact won the race, as he tells the Dodge 413's driver to "shut off" the car's engine and accept the fact that he has just been "shut down". It must be said, however, that many classic car enthusiasts and experienced muscle car drag racers have suggested over the years that in actuality, all things being equal (i.e. drivers of equal skill), an early 1960s SS Dodge Dart (most likely the 1962 Max Wedge variant) with its 413 cu. in. engine with twin 4-barrel carburetors ("dual quads") and ram-air induction, producing 410–420 horsepower, 460–470 torque, would have most likely easily beaten a 1963 Chevy Corvette Sting Ray with its fuel injected 327 cu. in. engine producing roughly 350–360 horsepower, 352 torque.  Also, the narrator even says that his "slicks" (tires) are starting to spin (lose traction) near the start of the race, and that the Dodge is "really digging in" with good traction, further suggesting that it is highly unlikely that the Sting Ray would have been able to catch up and overtake the superior powered and tractional Dodge Dart 413 in a ¼ mile drag race, even if the narrator did power shift and ride the clutch enough to burn the pressure plates.

Cash Box described it as "powerful" and having "top rock-a-teen sounds."

Personnel
 Mike Love – lead vocal, saxophone
 David Marks – rhythm guitar, lead guitar during fade-out
 Brian Wilson – harmony and backing vocals, bass guitar
 Carl Wilson – harmony and backing vocals, lead guitar
 Dennis Wilson – harmony and backing vocals, drums

Chart performance

Variations
A live version was released on Hawthorne, CA and the song is also part of a live medley on Endless Harmony. A 2003 stereo remix of the song appeared on the Sounds of Summer: The Very Best of The Beach Boys compilation. It also plays in the Super Mario Bros. Super Show episode "The Great BMX Race", and is the basis for "Go, Putt-Putt" in Putt-Putt Enters the Race.

Cover versions
The song was recorded and released by Jan & Dean on their 1982 album, One Summer Night/Live.

References

1963 songs
The Beach Boys songs
Jan and Dean songs
Songs about cars
Songs written by Brian Wilson
Songs written by Roger Christian (songwriter)
Song recordings produced by Nick Venet
Capitol Records singles